Jong-yul, also spelled Jong-yeol, is a Korean masculine given name. Its meaning differs based on the hanja used to write each syllable of the name. There are 19 hanja with the reading "jong" and six hanja with the reading "yul" on the South Korean government's official list of hanja which may be used in given names. Jong-yul was the tenth-most popular name for newborn boys in 1940, according to South Korean government data.

People with this name include:
Suk Jong-yul (born 1968), South Korean professional golfer 
Kim Jong-yeol, South Korean politician; see List of members of the National Assembly (South Korea), 1950–54
Kwon Jong-yul, South Korean bowler, competed in Bowling at the 1988 Summer Olympics
Oh Jong-yul, South Korean sailor, competed in Sailing at the 1988 Summer Olympics – Flying Dutchman

See also
List of Korean given names

References

Korean masculine given names